Eric Chiryoku is a multi-instrumental composer and pianist based in Singapore.

Biography

He received the Compass’ "Top Instrumental contemporary music award 2017" in Singapore.

Eric's debut album Winter Story was released in 2005 and was followed by Spring of Life in 2006. He released the third of his "seasonal" albums, Autumn Journey in 2012 and rounded up the 4 seasons with "Summer in my Heart" which was released in 2015.

In November 2013, Warner Music Singapore released a compilation album titled Journey of 3 Seasons, a selection of 20 tracks from some of his best works taken from the albums Winter Story, Spring Of Life, and Autumn Journey.

Album releases 

Winter Story: 2005
Spring Of Life: 2006
Autumn Journey: 2012
Journey of 3 Seasons: 2013
Summer In My Heart: 2015
The Beginning (EP): 2019
Journey of 4 Seasons: 2021

Singles

 Knowingly: 2020
 Faded Memories: 2020

References

Living people
Year of birth missing (living people)
Singaporean composers